Johanna Margarietha "Rieta" Schenk (born 31 July 1944) is a former South African archer. She represented South Africa at the 1992 Summer Olympics, which was also the first instance where South Africa were able to compete in the Olympic event since 1960 after the nation affected due to apartheid.

Schenk was the part of the South African archery team which also coincidentally made its debut in the 1992 Summer Olympics.

References 

1944 births
Living people
Olympic archers of South Africa
South African female archers
Archers at the 1992 Summer Olympics